Brændende kærlighed (English: Burning love) is a traditional Danish dish consisting of mashed potatoes topped with bacon and onions, both fried. The mashed potatoes might  also be topped with parsley, leek, or grated nutmeg.

It is traditional to serve this dish with "syltede rødbeder" (sweet pickled beets) as a sidedish.

See also
Danish cuisine

References

Danish cuisine
Bacon dishes
Meat and potatoes dishes